Salema Bazar is a village near Ambassa in Dhalai district of Tripura state of India.

References

Villages in Dhalai district